Miroslav Penkov is a Bulgarian writer who writes in English and Bulgarian. He was born in Gabrovo in Bulgaria in 1982, lived in Sofia for fourteen years and in 2001, at the age of 18, moved to the United States of America. He studied for a bachelor's degree in psychology and an M.F.A. in creative writing at the University of Arkansas. He teaches creative writing at the University of North Texas, where he is a fiction editor for the American Literary Review.

His stories have been translated in over a dozen languages and have appeared in A Public Space, Granta, One Story, The Southern Review, The Sunday Times, The Best American Short Stories 2008 (edited by Salman Rushdie), The PEN/O. Henry Prize Stories 2012 and The Best American Nonrequired Reading 2013.

Awards and honors
In 2007, his short story "Buying Lenin" won The Southern Review's Eudora Welty Prize in Fiction.

In 2012, his story "East of the West" won the BBC International Short Story Award.

In 2014, Penkov was selected as a protégé by mentor Michael Ondaatje as part of the Rolex Mentor and Protégé Arts Initiative, an international philanthropic programme that pairs masters in their disciplines with emerging talents for a year of one-to-one creative exchange.

WorksEast of the West: A Country in Stories, Farrar, Straus and Giroux 2011 (US, first edition). Stork Mountain: A Novel'', Farrar, Straus and Giroux, 2016 (US, first edition).

References

External links
Official website

Living people
1982 births
Bulgarian writers
American short story writers
People from Gabrovo
Bulgarian expatriates in the United States